opened in Yūbari, Hokkaidō, Japan in 1980. It documents the importance of coal mining to the local economy from the Meiji period to the Shōwa period. The museum is currently closed (October 1, 2017).

See also
 Ishikari coalfield
 Yubari King

References

External links
  Yūbari Coal Mine Museum

Yūbari, Hokkaido
Museums in Hokkaido
Museums established in 1980
1980 establishments in Japan
Mining museums in Japan
Coal mines in Japan
Coal museums